Ptichy Island (meaning 'Bird Island') is a small island in the Sea of Okhotsk. It lies close to the mainland off the western coast of the Kamchatka Peninsula.

Geography
It is a 0.8 km long and 0.35 km wide coastal island. It is located off a headland in the northeastern Sea of Okhotsk, separated from the continental shore by a 7.6 km wide sound.

Administratively Ptichy Island belongs to the Kamchatka Krai.

References

Islands of the Sea of Okhotsk
Islands of the Russian Far East
Islands of Kamchatka Krai